Susan Marie Guevara (born July 8, 1954) is the former head women's basketball coach at Central Michigan University. She previously served as the head women's basketball coach at the University of Michigan from 1996 to 2003. Sue announced her retirement from CMU on July 12, 2019.

Coaching career
Guevara began her coaching career as an assistant at Saginaw Valley State in 1979. After five seasons, she became a graduate assistant at Ohio State in 1984, become becoming an assistant coach at Ball State in 1985. Guevara spent a decade as an assistant coach at Michigan State under Karen Langeland, including as associate head coach in the 1995–96 season.

In 1996, Guevara became a head coach for the first time at Michigan. Inheriting a program whose winning percentage in the past four years was under .200, Guevara led Michigan to four consecutive postseason tournament berths, which had never occurred in program history. Guevara earned two Big Ten Coach of the Year honors (1998 and 2000).

She also coached at Auburn University from 2004 to 2007, under Nell Fortner.

In April 2007, Central Michigan hired Guevara as head coach.

Lawsuit
In 2009, she was named as a defendant in a lawsuit brought by Brooke Heike, a former player who lost her scholarship after the 2007–08 season. On May 3, 2010, all of Heike's claims against Coach Guevara and Central Michigan University were dismissed as lacking merit.

Head coaching record

Softball

Basketball

References

External links
Sue Guevara – CMUChippewas.com

1954 births
Living people
American women's basketball coaches
Auburn Tigers women's basketball coaches
Ball State Cardinals women's basketball coaches
Basketball coaches from Michigan
Basketball players from Michigan
Central Michigan Chippewas women's basketball coaches
American softball coaches
Saginaw Valley State Cardinals softball coaches
Michigan State Spartans women's basketball coaches
Michigan Wolverines women's basketball coaches
Ohio State Buckeyes women's basketball coaches
Ohio State University alumni
Sportspeople from Saginaw, Michigan
Saginaw Valley State Cardinals women's basketball players